Anil Rai Gupta (born 20 April 1969) is an Indian businessman. He is the chair and managing director of Havells India.

Early life and education 
Gupta was born on 20 April 1969 in Delhi. His father Qimat Rai Gupta was the founder of Havells.

Gupta attended St. Xavier's School in Delhi. He obtained a bachelor's degree in economics from Sriram College of Commerce, and an MBA from Wake Forest University, North Carolina.

Business career 
Gupta joined his father's company in 1992 as a non-executive director. He led Havells' acquisition of the European lighting company Sylvania and its restructuring as Havells Sylvania.

After his father's death in November 2014, Gupta succeeded him the chairman and managing director of Havells. He has focused on expanding the company's range of electrical consumer durables and improving its brand recognition.

Other activities and recognition 
Gupta is one of the founders of Ashoka University, a private liberal arts college in Haryana. He wrote a biography of his father, Havells: The Untold Story of Qimat Rai Gupta (2016), which was well received.

Gupta was awarded an Honorary Doctorate by his alma mater Wake Forest University in 2017. and the All India Management Association's Emerging Business Leader (2017). In FY 17–18 Anil Rai Gupta has also been honoured with ET Family Business of the year. Anil has also been named as "Entrepreneur for the year 2019" Forbes India Forbes India Leadership Award. He has been bestowed Business Today Best CEO in Consumer Durabale Category consecutively for 2019 & 2020

Personal life 
Gupta is married to Sangeeta Rai Gupta. They have two children.

References

External links
Anil Rai Gupta at Penguin India

1969 births
Living people
Businesspeople from Delhi
Indian chairpersons of corporations
Indian chief executives
Delhi University alumni
Wake Forest University alumni